Anna Smashnova was the defending champion, but chose not to participate this year.

Top seed Elena Dementieva won the title, defeating Chanda Rubin in the final, 6–3, 7–6(8–6).

Seeds
The top four seeds received a bye into the second round.

Draw

Finals

Top half

Bottom half

External links
2003 China Open Draw

China Open
2003 China Open (tennis)